Rhys Griffiths (born ) is a former professional rugby league footballer who played in the 2000s and 2010s.

He was named in the Wales team to face England at the Keepmoat Stadium prior to England's departure for the 2008 Rugby League World Cup.

He was selected for Wales for the 2009 European Cup and 2010 European Cup.

Genealogical information
Rhys Griffiths is the son of the rugby union footballer and coach, and rugby league footballer and coach; Clive Griffiths.

References

External links
Statistics at thecastlefordtigers.co.uk
Wales' youngsters must grow up against England
Rugby League: Griffiths in line for first cap

1987 births
Living people
Castleford Tigers players
English people of Welsh descent
English rugby league players
Rugby league centres
Rugby league players from St Helens, Merseyside
Rugby articles needing expert attention
Wales national rugby league team players